Mosweu is a surname of Botswanan origin. Notable people with the surname include:

 Rashaad Mosweu (born 1998), Botswana cricketer
 Reuben Mosweu, Botswana footballer

Surnames of Botswana